Crepinella is a genus of flowering plants in the family Araliaceae, native to tropical South America. It was resurrected from Schefflera in 2019.

Species
The following species are accepted:

Crepinella acaropunctata 
Crepinella auyantepuiensis 
Crepinella baculosa 
Crepinella brachypoda 
Crepinella chimantensis 
Crepinella clavigera 
Crepinella clusietorum 
Crepinella coriacea 
Crepinella disparifolia 
Crepinella dissidens 
Crepinella eximia 
Crepinella gracilis 
Crepinella gracillima 
Crepinella hitchcockii 
Crepinella huachamacarii 
Crepinella huberi 
Crepinella japurensis 
Crepinella longistyla 
Crepinella montana 
Crepinella myrioneura 
Crepinella neblinae 
Crepinella nigrescens 
Crepinella pallens 
Crepinella pauciradiata 
Crepinella psilophylla 
Crepinella simplex 
Crepinella spruceana 
Crepinella suaveolens 
Crepinella ulocephala 
Crepinella umbellata 
Crepinella umbraculifera 
Crepinella varisiana 
Crepinella weberbaueri

References

Araliaceae
Apiales genera